Venus Blindfolding Cupid is a c.1565 painting by Titian, now in the Galleria Borghese in Rome.

The painting has been copied many times.

This painting was formerly in the collection of Cornelis van der Geest and can be seen in two paintings of his art gallery in the 1630s by Willem van Haecht.

1565 paintings
Mythological paintings by Titian
Paintings in the Borghese Collection
Paintings of Venus
Paintings of Cupid